CKGR-FM is a Canadian radio station that broadcasts on 106.3 MHz in Golden, British Columbia.

Owned and operated by Bell Media, the station airs an adult hits format under the on-air brand Bounce 106.3.

CKGR also has an AM rebroadcaster at 870 kHz in Invermere with the call sign CKIR.

History
In 1973, Hall-Gray Broadcasting Co. Ltd. (Bob Hall and Walter Gray) received a licence to operate a new AM station at Golden. CKGR signed on the air in 1974 at 1400 kHz as a rebroadcaster of CKCR-FM. In 1984, CKGR received Canadian Radio-television and Telecommunications Commission (CRTC) approval to broadcast some local content of its own in addition to the content provided from CKCR and add a rebroadcaster of its own at Invermere, operating at 870 kHz with the call sign CKIR.

Over the years, the station went through different ownerships. In October 2007, the assets of Standard Radio, including CKGR, were purchased by Astral Media, and then Bell Media, which has been the owner of CKGR since 2013.

Switch to FM

On October 15, 2010, CKGR received approval by the CRTC to convert to the FM band at 106.3 MHz with an average effective radiated power of 890 watts to broadcast a soft adult contemporary format targeting adults aged 18 to 54.

As part of a mass format reorganization by Bell Media, on May 18, 2021, CKGR flipped to adult hits, and adopted the Bounce branding.

Rebroadcaster

See also
CKXR-FM

References

External links
 Bounce 106.3
 
 

Kgr
Kgr
Kgr
Radio stations established in 1974
1974 establishments in British Columbia